Bardera Airport  is an airport serving Bardera, a city in the southern Gedo region in Somalia.

Facilities

References

External links
 Aeronautical chart at SkyVector

Airports in Somalia
Gedo